Bogumił Witalis "Goosh" Andrzejewski (1922–1994) was a Polish-born, British-naturalised linguist whose research focused on the Somali language.

General references

External links
 

20th-century linguists
Linguists from Poland
Linguists from the United Kingdom
Somalists
Academics of SOAS University of London
1922 births
1994 deaths
Polish emigrants to the United Kingdom